go! Mokulele was an American business marketing inter-island flights within the state of Hawaii.  The airline was a joint venture between Mesa Airlines and Mokulele Flight Services formed in October 2009 when the companies merged their competing airline business subsidiaries, go! and Mokulele Airlines, under one umbrella company. Mesa Air Group owned approximately 75% of the company, while Transpac and other Mokulele shareholders owned approximately 25%. The airline had its headquarters in Honolulu CDP, City and County of Honolulu. Following Mesa's late 2011 divestiture of its ownership stake in Mokulele, Mesa announced it was discontinuing the "go! Mokulele" brand.

go! Mokulele did not hold its own air operator's certificate. Instead, flights were operated by Mesa Airlines and Mokulele Airlines for Go! Mokulele.

Destinations
All destinations served by go! Mokulele were in the state of Hawaii in the United States. The following destinations were served:

Fleet

See also

Airlines Based in Hawaii
 List of defunct airlines of the United States

References 

Defunct airlines of the United States
Airlines established in 2009
Airlines disestablished in 2012
Defunct regional airlines of the United States
Defunct companies based in Hawaii
Transportation in Hawaii County, Hawaii
Mesa Air Group
2009 establishments in Hawaii
2012 disestablishments in Hawaii

ja:モクレレ航空